Cymrite is a silicate mineral with the chemical formula BaAl2Si2(O,OH)8·H2O.  The mineral is named for Cymru, which is the Welsh word for Wales.

Cymrite, with perfect cleavage and a monoclinic crystalline system, falls in the silicate group. Silicates are formed of Silicon and Oxygen bonding together to form tetrahedra. The symmetry of Cymrite is classified as having a mirror plane. It has a moderate relief, meaning the contrast between the mineral and the epoxy of a thin section makes cymrite easily visible. The birefringence of the mineral is 0.01. Cymrite, being monoclinic is anisotropic with two optic axes.

Occurrence
Cymrite was discovered in Wales but is found in other areas throughout the United States, Africa, Greece and other parts of Europe. It occurs in generally high temperature-pressure areas such as the hydrothermal manganese silicate ore that makes up the Benalt Mine in Wales and in manganese rock that has undergone high-pressure metamorphism found in Greece. It is important to geologists because of its limited occurrence, when cymrite is present on a rock it indicates that the rock, at some point, must have experienced high pressure and temperature.

References 

Phyllosilicates
Barium minerals
Monoclinic minerals
Minerals in space group 6